Fritz Prause (born 20 March 1949) is an Austrian fencer. He competed in the individual and team sabre events at the 1972 Summer Olympics.

References 

1949 births
Living people
Austrian male fencers
Austrian sabre fencers
Olympic fencers of Austria
Fencers at the 1972 Summer Olympics